Thracia corbuloidea is a bivalve mollusc in the family Thraciidae.

Authority
The name was introduced in Blainville's "Manuel de Malacologie et de Conchyliologie" page 565 (issued 1825), without a description but with reference to plate 76, fig. 7; it only became available when the plate was published in 1827. The same name was introduced again by Blainville (1829) in his article "Thracie" of "Dictionnaire des Sciences Naturelles" (vol. 54, p. 316) with a reference to plate 76, fig. 7 in the Atlas of "Conchyliologie et Malacologie" of the "Dictionnaire", identical to that of the "Manuel". Blainville wrote that the specimen on which the taxon is based belongs to Deshayes' collection, therefore it is presumably an objective synonym of Thracia corbuloides Deshayes, 1830.

Description
The ovate shell is oblong, transverse, very inequivalve, inequilateral and very much inflated,. It ismarked with irregular lines of increase, entirely white, and covered with a grayish brown epidermis. The beaks of the valves are very large, protuberant and cordiform. The right valve, which is the larger, has its beak notched at its summit to receive the beak of the left valve. The cardinal edge is delicate.  It presents upon its posterior side a nympha, which projects within the valves, and which receives a ligament partly internal and partly external. The anterior extremity of the shell is obtuse, rounded. The posterior extremity is truncated : this side is bounded outwardly by a
very prominent obtuse angle, which extends obliquely from the beak to the lower part of the shell. Interiorly the valves are white. Two muscular impressions are seen, very much separated, the anterior of which is long and narrow.;The posterior is rounded. They are united by a palleal impression, deeply notched posteriorly.

Distribution
Thracia corbuloidea is found in the North Atlantic Ocean, off Spain, the Azores and the Canary Islands; also off Florida.  It is distributed widely round the coasts of Britain where it burrows in sandy or muddy substrates, extending its siphons to the surface to breathe and feed. It is also found  in the Mediterranean Sea (Greece, Turkey).

References

 Blainville H. M. (D. de) (1825-1827). Manuel de Malacologie et de Conchyliologie. Paris, Levrault : 1-647 (1825), 649-664 + 109 pl. (1827) 
 Repetto G., Orlando F. & Arduino G. (2005): Conchiglie del Mediterraneo, Amici del Museo "Federico Eusebio", Alba, Italy
 Smithsonian Institution: Thracia corbuloidea

Thraciidae
Bivalves described in 1827